Frederick Bennett (2 October 1906 – 20 August 1990) was an English professional footballer who played in the Football League for Bristol Rovers and Chester.

Born in Bristol, Bennett played local non-League football for Hanham Athletic and HJ Packers Ltd., as well as club cricket for Fry's and Packers. He joined Bristol Rovers as a full back in December 1925, and in a four-and-a-half-year stay with the club he made 129 League appearances, scoring twice. In 1930 he joined Chester (later renamed Chester City) when they were a non-League team, but they were elected to the Football League at the end of his first season there. He went on to play 158 League games and scoring a single goal, before moving to Nantwich (now Nantwich Town) in 1935 and Oswestry Town in 1937.

On retiring from football he returned to his home city of Bristol to live, and also served in North Africa during World War II.

Sources

1906 births
1990 deaths
English footballers
Association football defenders
English Football League players
Bristol Rovers F.C. players
Chester City F.C. players
Nantwich Town F.C. players
Oswestry Town F.C. players
Footballers from Bristol
British military personnel of World War II